The Chinese Elm cultivar Ulmus parvifolia 'Todd' was developed by Fleming's Nurseries in Victoria, Australia, and registered in 2001.

Description
The clone has a pronounced upright habit.

Pests and diseases
The species and its cultivars are highly resistant, but not immune, to Dutch elm disease, and unaffected by the Elm Leaf Beetle Xanthogaleruca luteola.

Cultivation
'Todd' is not known to have been introduced (2006) to Europe or North America.

Accessions

Australasia

Waite Arboretum , University of Adelaide, Adelaide, Australia. Acc. no. 379

Nurseries

Australasia

Fleming's Nursery , Monbulk, Victoria, Australia

References

External links
Plant Breeders Rights: Ulmus parvifolia 'Todd'

Chinese elm cultivar
Ulmus articles missing images
Ulmus